Carlos Leonardo de la Rosa (2 March 1944 – 27 October 2022) was an Argentine lawyer, diplomat, and politician. A member of the Justicialist Party, he served in the Argentine Senate from 1995 to 2001. He was also ambassador to Chile from 2002 to 2003.

De la Rosa died on 27 October 2022, at the age of 78.

References

1944 births
2022 deaths
Argentine politicians
Ambassadors of Argentina to Chile
Members of the Argentine Senate for Mendoza
Justicialist Party politicians
National University of Cuyo alumni